is a Japanese light novel series written by Yū Okano and illustrated by Jaian. It has been serialized online via the user-generated novel publishing website Shōsetsuka ni Narō since September 2016. It was later acquired by Overlap, who have published eleven volumes since October 2017 under their Overlap Novels imprint.

A manga adaptation illustrated by Haiji Nakasone has been serialized in Overlap's Comic Gardo website since November 2017, with its chapters collected into ten tankōbon volumes as of October 2022. An anime television series adaptation has been announced.

Media

Light novels
Written by Yū Okano, The Unwanted Undead Adventurer began publication online via the user-generated novel publishing website Shōsetsuka ni Narō on September 22, 2016. The series was later acquired by Overlap, who began publishing the novels with illustrations by Jaian on October 25, 2017, under their Overlap Novels imprint. As of October 25, 2022, eleven volumes have been released. J-Novel Club has licensed the novels in North America.

Manga
A manga adaptation illustrated by Haiji Nakasone began serialization online via Overlap's Comic Gardo website on November 24, 2017. As of October 25, 2022, ten tankōbon volumes have been released. J-Novel Club has also licensed the manga.

Anime
An anime television series adaptation was announced at the "Overlap Bunko 9th Anniversary Online Event" on April 17, 2022.

References

External links
  at Shōsetsuka ni Narō 
  
  
 

2017 Japanese novels
Anime and manga based on light novels
Dark fantasy anime and manga
J-Novel Club books
Japanese fantasy novels
Japanese webcomics
Light novels
Light novels first published online
Shōnen manga
Shōsetsuka ni Narō
Upcoming anime television series
Webcomics in print